Alexandria High School, Alexandria Senior High School, or Alexandria City High School may refer to:
 Alexandria City High School (Virginia)
 Alexandria High School (Alabama)
 Alexandria Senior High School (Louisiana)